is a Japanese director and storyboard artist best known for directing March Comes In like a Lion.

Career
Okada started off in the anime industry as a production assistant for Zoids: Genesis in 2005 at Group TAC. Over several years, Okada worked to this capacity, and in 2007 was promoted to production manager on Nenbutsu Monogatari (released in 2008). Two years later, in 2010, he made his debut as an episode director on episode 124 of Hana Kappa. That year, however, Group TAC filed for bankruptcy, and Okada had a short tenure at Studio CJT (founded by former Group TAC members) as a producer, but that same year became a freelancing director. In 2012, he became associated with Shaft and made his debut with the studio on the 2nd episode of Nekomonogatari: Black. For the next 4 years, he participated in a number of Shaft productions as an episode director and storyboard artist, and in 2016 made his debut as a series director with the studio on March Comes In like a Lion, which received positive reviews from critics. Okada occasionally works with other companies, but a majority of his output continues to be with Shaft.

Style
In an interview between him and Shaft colleague Hajime Ootani, the two were asked to describe each other's styles and processes as directors. Commenting on his own style, Okada stated that he gave more attention to appealing to fans of the works he was adapting and the original author's expectations, to which Ootani supported and gave admiration for.

Works

Television series
 Highlights roles with series directorial duties. Highlights roles with assistant director or supervising duties.

ONAs

Films

Video games
 Highlights roles with series directorial duties.

Notes

References

External links
 
 

Anime directors
Living people
Japanese directors
Year of birth missing (living people)